Events in the year 1882 in Iceland.

Incumbents 

 Monarch: Christian IX
 Minister for Iceland: Johannes Nellemann

Events 

 3 April – The National Archives of Iceland is established.
 An agricultural school is founded in Hólar, which would eventually become the Hólar University College.
 Single women and widows were granted the right to vote.

Births 

 2 February – Jóhann Gunnar Sigurðsson, poet.

References 

 
1880s in Iceland
Years of the 19th century in Iceland
Iceland
Iceland